Shai Gabso (July 20, 1984) is an Israeli singer. He won third place in the first season of Kokhav Nolad ("A Star is Born") and first place in the second season of The Singer in the Mask.

Gabso was born in Rishon Lezion to a Tunisian-Jewish family. He became religiously observant at the age of twelve. He began his military service in the Israel Defense Forces in the early 2000s, serving as a composer for the Israeli Air Force Band. During his military service, he appeared on the first season of Kokhav Nolad. Gabso's single Arim Roshi (I Will Lift My Head) has been hailed as a patriotic anthem. He collaborates with Nefesh Yehudi, a Jewish outreach organization that exposes secular college-age students in Israel and Europe to Judaism.

References

External links

1984 births
21st-century Israeli male singers
Living people
Kokhav Nolad contestants
People from Rishon LeZion
Israeli people of Tunisian-Jewish descent
Israeli military musicians
Masked Singer winners